Great Mitton is a civil parish in Ribble Valley, Lancashire, England.  It contains 17 listed buildings that are recorded in the National Heritage List for England.  Of these, one is listed at Grade I, the highest of the three grades, one is at Grade II*, the middle grade, and the others are at Grade II, the lowest grade.  The parish contains the village of Great Mitton and is otherwise completely rural.  It is bounded by the Rivers Hodder and Ribble, and bridges crossing them are listed.  The other listed buildings include houses, farmhouses, a barn, a church with associated strictures, public houses, a cross base, and a milestone.

Key

Buildings

References

Citations

Sources

Lists of listed buildings in Lancashire
Buildings and structures in Ribble Valley